959 Arne (prov. designation:  or ) is a background asteroid and slow rotator, approximately  in diameter, located in the outer region of the asteroid belt. It was discovered by German astronomer Karl Reinmuth at the Heidelberg-Königstuhl State Observatory on 30 September 1921. The X-type asteroid has an exceptionally long rotation period of 123.7 hours. It was named after Arne Asplind, son of Swedish astronomer Bror Asplind (1890–1954).

Orbit and classification 

Arne is a non-family asteroid of the main belt's background population when applying the hierarchical clustering method to its proper orbital elements. It orbits the Sun in the outer asteroid belt at a distance of 2.5–3.9 AU once every 5 years and 8 months (2,070 days; semi-major axis of 3.18 AU). Its orbit has an eccentricity of 0.22 and an inclination of 4° with respect to the ecliptic.

Naming 

This minor planet was named after Arne Asplind, son of Swedish astronomer Bror Ansgar Asplind (1890–1954). Asteroids 958 Asplinda, 960 Birgit and 961 Gunnie are named after him and his two daughters, respectively. The  was mentioned in The Names of the Minor Planets by Paul Herget in 1955.

Physical characteristics 

In the SDSS-based taxonomy, Arne an X-type asteroid.

Rotation period 

In November 2007, a rotational lightcurve of Arne was obtained from photometric observations by Robert Stephens at GMARS  and Santana observatories  in California. Analysis gave a bimodal lightcurve with an exceptionally long rotation period of  hours and a brightness amplitude of  magnitude. The results supersede an incorrect period of 8.60 hours from a noisy lightcurve taken by Larry E. Robinson at Sunflower Observatory  in Kansas in November 2001.

Diameter and albedo 

The Collaborative Asteroid Lightcurve Link derives an albedo of 0.0258 and a diameter of 57.20 km based on an absolute magnitude of 10.8. An asteroid occultation on 3 February 2015, gave a best-fit ellipse dimension of 53.0 × 53.0 kilometers. These timed observations are taken when the asteroid passes in front of a distant star. However the quality of the measurements are poorly rated.

References

External links 
 Lightcurve Database Query (LCDB), at www.minorplanet.info
 Dictionary of Minor Planet Names, Google books
 Discovery Circumstances: Numbered Minor Planets (1)-(5000) – Minor Planet Center
 
 

000959
Discoveries by Karl Wilhelm Reinmuth
Named minor planets
000959
19210930